Habib Al-Habib (Born 25 June 1976) is a Saudi Arabian television actor, known for his role in the Saudi comedy Ghashmshm along with fellow actor Fahad Al-Hian. Another honorable titles include comical shows such as WiFi, a short ran TV show aired on the Ramadan of 2014.

Career
Al-Habib started his acting career at young age, he took some small roles in Tash Ma Tash, after become a famous he participated in several series, together with actors including Fahad Al-Hian and Hiah Al-Shuaibi they acting in a famous serial called Ghamshm. in 2008 he participated in serial called Kolna Iyal Griah.

Selected works

Series
No roaming (2021)
Studio 21 (2021)
Tash Ma Tash (1993-2011)
Ghamshm
Chdid wa Tmamam
Jari Ya Hammouda  with Yousef Al-Jarrah
Kolna Iyal Griah
Almoktar (2010)
WiFi (2014-2015)

Plays
Al-Biat Al-Aliy
Sarrokh and Farrukh

References

1976 births
Living people
Saudi Arabian male stage actors
Saudi Arabian male television actors
People from Riyadh